A bubblegram (also known as laser crystal, 3D crystal engraving or vitrography) is a solid block of glass or transparent plastic that has been exposed to laser beams to generate three-dimensional designs inside. The image is composed of many small points of fracture or other visible deformations and appears to float inside the block.

Description
Each point is created by a laser beam focused to high intensity at that location by a computer-controlled opto-mechanical system. A complex or highly detailed image occupying a 5 cm (2 inch) cubic volume typically requires the creation of tens of thousands of such points.

Bubblegram images may be created by intersecting laser beams in appropriately doped plastic to induce a chemical reaction via heat or photonic excitation, creating bubbles or nodes where the plastic has a different index of refraction.

Glass block bubblegrams of Russian origin entered international commerce as a novelty in the late 1990s, but high prices and the predominantly simple, inartistic subject matter severely limited market penetration. In the early 2000s, a much less expensive, more visually appealing and highly diverse array of Chinese-made bubblegram novelties achieved wide commercial success in the United States, to the extent of becoming a fad: representations of monuments, corporate symbols, religious imagery, mythical creatures and nature scenes appeared in gift shops.

There also exist companies which will take custom photographs of people, convert them to a heightmap, then render that as a bubblegram memento.

See also
 List of laser articles
 Volumetric display

References

External links
 Laser Crystal Technique How a single conical laser beam makes a bubblegram

3D imaging
Glass art
Laser applications